Titanodula is a genus of mantids in the subfamily Hierodulinae. There are currently five species placed in Titanodula. The genus is endemic to Asia and is distinguished from the similar genus Hierodula by the large size and unique male genitalia of its member species.

Species 
 Titanodula attenboroughi 
 Titanodula formosana 
 Titanodula fruhstorferi 
 Titanodula grandis 
 Titanodula menglaensis

References 

Hierodulinae